Chandrika is a 1950 Indian Malayalam-language film, directed by V. S. Raghavan and produced by K. M. K. Menon. The film stars Thikkurissy Sukumaran Nair and Nagavally R. S. Kurup. The film had musical score by V. Dakshinamoorthy and G. Govindarajulu Naidu. The film was simultaneously produced in Tamil with the same title and was released on 29 September 1950.

Plot

Cast 
 Thikkurissy Sukumaran Nair as Gopi
 Sethulakshmi (Old) as Chandrika
 Nagavally R. S. Kurup
 Gopalan Nair
 Kareepra Balakrishnan Nair
 Padmini
 V. N. Janaki
 Malathi  as Vimala
 K. Sarangapani as Prof. Raan
 Kumaran Bhagavathar
 S. P. Pillai
 Aranmula Ponnamma
 K. N. Gopalan Nair as Janardanan Pillai
 M. G. Menon as Mohan
 Saraswathi
 Bharathi (Old) as Malini
 Kamalakshi
 P. K. Vikraman Nair as Radhakrishnan
 T. S. Balaiah

Soundtrack 
Music was composed by V. Dakshinamoorthy & G. Govindarajulu Naidu.

Malayalam songs 
Lyrics were penned by Thumbaman Padmanabhan Kutty and P. Bhaskaran. Playback singers are V. N. Sundaram, P. Leela, Jikki and N. Lalitha.

Tamil songs 
Lyrics were penned by P. Bhaskaran. Playback singers are P. Leela and Jikki.

References

External links 
 
  - A song from the Tamil version sung by P. Leela

1950 films
1950s Malayalam-language films